The history of U.S. Salernitana 1919, so renamed since 12 July 2012, officially started in 2011 as Salerno Calcio, following the collapse of Salernitana Calcio 1919 in Lega Pro Prima Divisione, based in Salerno, Campania. The previous incarnation of the club was founded in 1919 as Unione Sportiva Salernitana, changing its name to Salernitana Sport in 1978 and being refounded in 2005 with Salernitana Calcio 1919.

From 1919 to today

Unione Sportiva Salernitana 
Unione Sportiva Salernitana was founded on 19 June 1919 by Adalgiso Onesti, who initiated the merger of an older club using the same name; which itself was founded in 1911 by a merger of four local clubs; and Foot-Ball Club Salerno.

The club was known as Società Sportiva Salernitanaudax for a time during the 1920s.

Salernitana Sport 
In 1978 the club was renamed Salernitana Sport.
It can be argued that Salernitana's best period as a club was 1997–1999. In the 1997–98 season, Salernitana topped Serie B and gained their second promotion to Serie A (first was in 1947–48). A young Marco Di Vaio led the scoring charts with 21 goals. In the 1998–99 season, their first in Serie A after 50 years, Salernitana fought hard and were led by Cameroonian international Rigobert Song and Salvatore Fresi in defense, a young Gennaro Gattuso in midfield, and Marco Di Vaio and David Di Michele leading the attack. They recorded surprise wins against Inter, Juventus, Roma and Lazio. They finished 1 point shy of salvation and were relegated.

Since then, the club did not manage to return to the top flight, and was excluded from Serie B in 2005.

Salernitana Calcio 1919 
In the summer 2005 was established Salernitana Calcio 1919, a new club which started again from Serie C1. In 2008, Salernitana finally returned to Serie B as Serie C1/B champions, after mathematically securing the title on 27 April.

In the season 2009-10 the club was relegated to Lega Pro Prima Divisione with 6-point deduction for economic default.

In the summer 2011, it did not appeal against the exclusion of Covisoc and it is definitely excluded by the Italian football.

From Salerno Calcio to U.S. Salernitana 1919 
On 21 July 2011 the new club of Salerno Calcio was founded in the city by the company Morgenstern S.r.l.; however, they were forced to give up their Salernitana Calcio 1919 name for the present one.

The club in the 2011–12 season was immediately promoted to Lega Pro Seconda Divisione winning the Group G of Serie D.

On 12 July 2012 the club was renamed U.S. Salernitana 1919.

Notable players

Presidential history
Below is the complete presidential history of Salernitana, from when Adalgiso Onesti was first in place at the club in 1919 to 2011.

Managerial history

Salernitana have had many managers and trainers running the team during their history, here is a chronological list of them from 1919 onwards.

References

Salernitana
U.S. Salernitana 1919